Hampden Row is a historic hamlet in the Chiltern Hills of Buckinghamshire, England.  It is located in Great Hampden parish. At the 2011 Census the population of the hamlet was included in the civil parish of Great and Little Hampden.

Hamlets in Buckinghamshire